365 Fri was the debut album of the Norwegian band Tre Små Kinesere. It was an instant hit in their home country, reaching number two on the album charts. Their acoustic, melodic pop songs written by singer and guitarist Ulf Risnes represented an antithesis to the predominant punk-inspired rock played by bands such as Dum Dum Boys or Raga Rockers. The songs "Ingen Blir Igjen" ("No one Remains", dealing with the problem of depopulation of regional Norway) and "Kjærlighet" ("Love", about problematic relationships) have become airplay classics.

Track listing
 Ingen blir igjen
 Du e der væl?
 Matbit
 365 fri
  Da jorda va flat
 Kamerat pære
 Hei verden
 Viktig ærend
 Glyserinmusikk
 Salig
 Okavango
 Kjærlighet
 Sorte Tyr

References

External links
 Tre Små Kinesere bio at Norsk Rikskringkasting

1990 debut albums